Jean Léon Côté (May 26, 1867 – September 23, 1924) was a prominent French-Canadian politician. He served as a member of the Legislative Assembly of Alberta from 1909 until 1923 sitting with the provincial Liberal Party in both government and opposition. He vacated his provincial seat when he was appointed to the Senate of Canada in 1923. He served until his death in 1924 sitting with the federal Liberal caucus.

Early life
Jean Léon Côté was born on May 26, 1867, in the village of Les Éboulements, Canada East, to Cléophas and Denise Côté. Côté was a surveyor and civil engineer by trade, and first visited the Edmonton area in 1886 as part of a survey crew. He returned to the East and trained as a Dominion Land Surveyor for the Department of the Interior, where he worked from 1893 to 1900. He participated in a number of high-profile projects, including the Alaska Boundary Commission.

Political career
Côté ran for a seat to the Alberta Legislature in the 1909 Alberta general election. He stood as the Liberal candidate in the electoral district of Athabasca defeating incumbent Liberal candidate William Bredin in a hotly contested race.

The 1913 boundary redistribution added a number of new electoral districts to the province. Côté ran for re-election in the new electoral district of Grouard for the election held that year. He won a comfortable margin of victory over the Conservative candidate to pick up the new seat for his party.

Côté ran for a third term in office in the 1917 Alberta general election. He significantly increased his popular vote winning a landslide in the two way race. After the election Côté was appointed to a provincial cabinet post in 1918. He assumed the responsibility of the Provincial Secretary position, and held it until his government was defeated in 1921.

Côté ran for a fourth term in office in the 1921 Alberta general election. He held his seat in a very hotly contested race over United Farmers candidate H.G. Dimsdale. Côté managed to hang on despite most of the Liberal caucus getting swept out of office.

Côté was appointed to the Senate of Canada on the advice of Mackenzie King on August 14, 1923 to represent Alberta. He sat with the Liberal Party of Canada caucus. Côté vacated his seat in the Legislature on November 10, 1923. He held his seat for a year until he died on September 23, 1924.

Personal life
Jean Côté married Cécile Gagnon, who came from a wealthy Quebec City family, on February 4, 1907, and together had four children. His son Ernest Côté, a soldier and a diplomat.

Honours
Mount Côté located along the Alberta-British Columbia border, and the Hamlet of Jean Cote, Alberta in the Municipal District of Smoky River No. 130 is named after Côté.

References

External links
 

1867 births
1924 deaths
Liberal Party of Canada senators
Canadian senators from Alberta
Alberta Liberal Party MLAs
Members of the Executive Council of Alberta
Franco-Albertan people
People from Capitale-Nationale